Paul Joseph Bitz (September 18, 1923 – February 21, 2014) was an American politician.

Born in Evansville, Indiana, he served in the United States Army Air Forces during World War II. He graduated from Reitz Memorial High School and then from the University of Evansville. He served in the Indiana State Senate from 1954 to 1962 as a Democrat. He died in Evansville, Indiana.

Notes

1923 births
2014 deaths
Politicians from Evansville, Indiana
Military personnel from Indiana
University of Evansville alumni
United States Army Air Forces soldiers
Democratic Party Indiana state senators
United States Army Air Forces personnel of World War II